Fuego y Ternura is the third studio album from Mexican pop music singer and actress Lucerito. It was released on 1985. Lucerito started to be recognized in an international level with this album. For the Spotify version of the album, the title was changed to Magia and features a different album cover and track list.

Track listing
The album is composed of ten songs; all of them were arranged by different songwriters, among them Joan Sebastian.

Singles

Sales
Lucero manages to sell over 350,000 units, of which 80,000 were sold in Mexico and U.S.A., reaching the status of platinum disc.

Reference list

1985 albums
Lucero (entertainer) albums